Widow inheritance (also known as bride inheritance) is a cultural and social practice whereby a widow is required to marry a male relative of her late husband, often his brother. The practice is more commonly referred as a levirate marriage, examples of which can be found in ancient and biblical times.

The practice was instituted as a means for the widow to have someone to support her and her children financially, and to keep her late husband's wealth within the family bloodline. At the time it was initiated, women were responsible for the house chores and men were the providers, therefore if the woman lost her husband, she would have no one to provide for the remaining family. Because her in-laws would not want someone outside of the family's blood line to inherit her late husband's estate, she was required to marry within the family.

This can have various forms and functions in different cultures, serving in relative proportions as a social protection for, and control over, the widow and her children. She may have the right to require her late husband's extended family to provide her with a new man, or conversely she might have the obligation to accept the man put forward by the family, with no real prospect of turning him down, if her birth family will not accept her back into their home.

The custom is sometimes justified on the basis that it ensures that the wealth does not leave the patrilineal family. It is also sometimes justified as a protection for the widow and her children. The practice has existed in varied cultures and historical periods. It is a current custom in several sub-Saharan Africa nations and ethnic groups.

Judaism

A form of widow inheritance is part of Mosaic law, where it is known as levirate marriage (see yibbum). A feature of this practice is that the dead husband's brother is obligated to marry his dead brother's widow. However, this applies only if the widow (and consequently the deceased husband) had no children. However, there are mechanisms whereby either party can avoid such a marriage.

Afghanistan 
Among Pashtun communities, the code known as Pashtunwali requires a widow to marry, even against her will, her dead husband's brother or cousin. The code also requires that her children be treated as children of the new husband. The Taliban campaigned against the practice as being against shariah law.

Widowhood in sub-Saharan Africa
The circumstances of widows in sub-Saharan African nations are complicated by both economic challenges and traditional social expectations. As of 2015, over 9 million widows face extreme poverty in sub-Saharan Africa. In many nations, policy contributes to the inability of widows to acquire economic independence after the death of their husbands. A widow may need to abide by widow inheritance traditions and remain with the husband's family, often requiring her to marry the husband's brother, to ensure that she remains in possession of property. Widow Inheritance traditions are particularly prevalent in sub-Saharan Africa, compared to the rest of the continent, and these traditions are reported across many nations in the region. Widows face a lack of legal rights to family property due to gender-discriminatory legal systems. They are unlikely to have the resources to utilize legal systems as a means of fighting traditional power structures. There are many formal and informal rules concerning the inheritance of property, particularly land for rural women, that inhibit stable economic conditions. Due to these limitations, widows are coerced into inheritance traditions as a means of maintaining stability for their families. These widow inheritance traditions often include "cleansing" rituals, depending on the traditional culture of a given region.

In many sub-Saharan regions, such as within the Ovambo culture of Namibia, formal and informal structures of gender inequality force widows to sacrifice their independence for inheritance traditions either within the late husband's family or externally. Widow inheritance often emerges to combat property loss and social rejection, and forced re-marriage to a brother of the deceased husband is a common widow inheritance tradition that many traditional cultures promote.

Many modern legal systems in sub-Saharan Africa, such as within the Tanzanian government, have attempted to combat the customary law that enforces structures of inheritance and disinheritance. However, poor application and enforcement of these modern legal systems ensures that customary law remains the default in countries such as Ghana, Nigeria, Tanzania, Zambia, and Zimbabwe.

Premature widowhood 
Widow inheritance traditions are exacerbated by the prevalence of premature widowhood across sub-Saharan Africa, such as in Igbos community of Nigeria. Premature widowhood is linked to severe consequences of poverty, as it has intergenerational implications due to young women with dependent children facing widowhood. Women that were dependent on their husbands as their source of income face major challenges if they become widows, as there are many regions, such as Kenya, in sub-Saharan Africa where women's paid employment is scarce, low paid, and often socially unacceptable. In many regions, not only is female financial independence difficult to achieve, being a single woman is also not socially acceptable. A severe lack of state welfare provisions, such as healthcare, childcare systems, and education, encourage widows to find other modes of financial stability. These factors greatly contribute to the perseverance of widow inheritance traditions.

Disinheritance practices 
Widows are motivated to remarry and partake in widow inheritance traditions due to disinheritance practices in sub-Saharan Africa. Disinheritance occurs when widows are dispossessed by their late husband's family, which can take the form of losing control of family land, outright eviction, and abandonment of familial relations, and in more dire conditions, confiscation of the children by the late husband's family. Rural sub-Saharan African women face a level of disinheritance not typical to any other global region. Sub-Saharan widows, particularly in Kenya and Nigeria, experience a higher prevalence of eviction risk by relatives. Disinheritance and property thefts have been reported by both rural and urban Nigerian widows. The Immigration and Refugee Board of Canada depicts a common situation in the following summation of expert evidence provided to them:

The disinheritance of widows has been coined as "grabbing" across sub-Saharan Africa. The term grabbing refers to the immediate actions of eviction and property theft, and these customs are often enabled and bolstered by legal systems. For example, in Eswatini, widows are not given any rights to property in the eyes of the law. These grabbing traditions are prevalent in Angola, Botswana, RotC, DRC, Eswatini, Ivory Coast, Ghana, Kenya, Lesotho, Malawi, Namibia, Nigeria, Rwanda, Senegal, Tanzania, Uganda, Zambia and Zimbabwe. Widow inheritance and re-marriage becomes a necessary "safety net" for widows that do not have other options to maintain livelihood.

Forms 
Widow Inheritance can take many different modes, namely forced re-marriage to a brother of the deceased husband, a return to the widow's parents' home, or a more exploitive inheritance to professional traveling widow inheritors. The prevalence of each form varies between sub-Saharan regions and across ethnic groups, and patterns of kinship and inheritance patterns cannot be ascribed uniformly due to stark differences in ethnic tradition. For example, in Kenya, for the Nandi, it is infrequent for a widow to participate in levirate marriage, yet for the Luo, widow inheritance is a cultural requirement.

Inheritance is often distinct from marriage, as "cleansing" practices often are a prerequisite for a widow after the death of her husband. Widows are then inherited by a man, often her late-husband's brother, after she has been "cleansed", or ritually purified. This tradition is enforced in the Luo community in Kenya, as a woman must engage in sexual intercourse without a condom to achieve purity before she can remarry. Many men have commercialized and exploited the practice by becoming professional widow inheritors, as many in-law relatives of widows are less inclined to perform the "cleansing" practices themselves due to a fear of contracting HIV from the widow. It is becoming common in Kenya for professional widow-inheritors to receive compensation for completing inheritance practices. Professional inheritors travel to different communities to inherit widows for financial gain, and often coerce widows to comply with sexual rituals in exchange for providing support.

Many widows enter an inheritance contract for companionship and social, economic, and emotional support, and widow inheritance for these purposes is generally long-term and monogamous. Widow Inheritance for the purpose of executing a sexual ritual or "cleansing" is generally short-term, often involving more inheritors.

"Cleansing" practices 
"Cleansing" is a form of ritual purification rites culturally prescribed for women following the death of a husband. It often involves forced sexual intercourse with a male "inheritor" of the widow. The practice has not been systematically outlawed across sub-Saharan Africa, but rather encouraged in many rural communities such as the Luo community in Kenya and Tanzania or the Igbo community in Nigeria. Cleansing occurs as it is believed to free the widow from a supernatural connection to her dead husband's spirit. It is very common for such "cleansing" procedures to be the only choice widows have in the wake of their husband's death, as without a proper cleansing, the widow and her family will be socially rejected. These rituals are frequently traumatic violations in which widows may be forced to drink the water in which their dead husband's body was washed, and are coerced into sex with a relative or inheritor. In extreme circumstances, widows may be required to "have sex with their husband's dead body" to complete a cleansing ritual. These traditions are rooted in spiritual fears of contamination, and have been reported in a number of countries of sub-Saharan Africa. The superstitions of "evil spirits" inhabiting widows before "cleansing" are norms within many communities, and widows are often not permitted to work or interact with those outside their families until the cleansing is executed. Those who violate these norms can face severe social stigma and repercussions in her community.

Widow Inheritance relationships center on "cleansing" the widow after the death of her husband as well as fulfilling the goal of furthering the late husband's lineage. Sexual intercourse can function as a means of "cleansing", bearing children for the husband's family, sexual companionship, and other sexual rituals associated with widows. Widows are often required to engage in ritual sex during the establishment of homes and during food production seasons, often to protect the widow or her family members.

Legislation 
CEDAW includes a provision on Widow Inheritance that asserts that "State Parties shall take all appropriate measures to eliminate discrimination against women in all matters relating to marriage and family relations and in particular shall ensure, on a basis of equality of men and women: the same rights for both spouses in respect of the ownership, acquisition, enjoyment and disposition of property." Although CEDAW broadly rejects Widow Inheritance in the eyes of the law, informal practice and more localized law has not followed this international guidance.

Although many African nations practice Widow Inheritance without explicit legalization, in Zambia, the custom of Widow Inheritance was put into law with the 1929 Brother's Widow's Marriage Act, which legalizes widow inheritance, regardless of consent, by the deceased husband's family. In Tanzania, although widows are given equal rights to inheritance under the constitution, customary law overrules the nation's legislation, especially in rural areas. Customary law requires widow inheritance practices, despite that Tanzania largely condemns inheritance in national rhetoric. Although inheritance of a widow by the husband's family and disinheritance practices of eviction are illegal in Namibia, the practices continue due to the country's fragile legal system. Namibia has seen legislation changes in the past decades to account for women's rights after the death of her husband, especially in the proposal of the Communal Land Reform Act of 2002.

Some African nations have enacted legislation in the past two decades to combat the social justice concerns of widowhood. The Criminal Code Amendment Act of Ghana criminalized subjecting a woman to widowhood rites, and those who violate this act will be guilty of misdemeanors in the eyes of the law. In Nigeria, in the Enugu state, the Prohibition of the Infringement of a Widow's and a Widower's Fundamental Rights Law of 2001, outlawed compelling a widow or widower to vacate the matrimonial home. This law gave widows more options, other than inheritance practices, after the death of their husbands.

HIV/AIDS related concerns 

Widow Inheritance traditions dramatically increase the risk of infection with HIV and other sexually transmitted diseases, such as Hepatitis B, for the widow and the widow inheritor. As the HIV/AIDS epidemic began in the 1970s, the practice of widow inheritance evolved in response to the increased risk. Primarily, premature widowhood increased prevalence dramatically as many men died of HIV/AIDS. Secondarily, brothers of the widow's late husband were more reluctant to partake in "cleansing" rituals due to the high mortality rate of the disease. Many of these young widows suffered from HIV/AIDS themselves, and professional widow-inheritance emerged as a response to the growing demand for widow-inheritance traditions to continue despite the new risks. Although professional widow-inheritance began as a response to the HIV/AIDS crisis, it also contributes to the transmission of HIV/AIDS as professional inheritors move from village to village performing "cleansing" rituals. Additionally, it is frequent that using a condom during a sexual rite is considered to break the custom of inheritance, and condoms are largely avoided in inheritance relationships.

In many circumstances, such as within the Luo community of Kenya, if a widow refuses inheritance from a professional widow inheritor, frequently out of fear of HIV/AIDS, she is often forced off her husband's land. HIV/AIDS concerns are further exacerbated in these conditions as widows are often pushed into sex work to make a living as employment prospects for both women and widows can be difficult.

The practice of "cleansing" is recognized as a serious concern for the HIV/AIDS pandemic, and there is a link between widow inheritance, property rights, and the spread of the disease. Professional inheritance and "cleansing" traditions have been linked to the spread of HIV/AIDS in Kenya, and in many African countries, including Uganda, Malawi, Zambia, Ghana, Senegal, Cote d’Ivoire, Republic of the Congo (RotC), Democratic Republic of the Congo (DRC), and Nigeria, Widow Inheritance is commonly viewed as contributing to the rapid spread of HIV.

Widows are often expected to fulfill various sexual rituals within her community, as is common in the Luo community, such as sexual intercourse during the establishment of a home, during agricultural cycles, or during funeral or marriage ceremonies. If a widow has not been inherited by her brother-in-law, but rather a professional widow-inheritor, her risk of contracting HIV increases as she must find a partner to engage with in the ritual. Many widows are aware of the greater risk for HIV that they face by engaging in "cleansing" and inheritance rituals, but the pressure of cultural expectations and ensuring livelihood needs are met complicates their ability to avoid contracting the disease.

Attempts to modify the law in many sub-Saharan African nations have been in response to the HIV/AIDS concerns of the widow-inheritance practice, rather than concerns regarding the emotional trauma of inheritance "cleansing". However, modifications to formal law are often ineffective without informal implementations of changes to traditional practices. Health officials in Malawi unsuccessfully banned widow "cleansing", but were able to persuade some traditional leaders to encourage condom usage and punish cleansers who force women into unprotected sex. In Zambia, the AIDS Care and Prevention Department at Chikankata Hospital found success in encouraging alternative ritualistic methods of "cleansing" that do not involve sexual practices, and eventually the chiefs in the Chikankata District area outlawed ritual cleansing by sexual intercourse in the 1990s.

Effects on widows' children 
Premature widowhood results in a higher number of widows with dependent children, and the children of widows are often faced with dire experiences as a result of the socio-economic consequences of widow inheritance. When a widow is faced with disinheritance practices, the consequences of the loss of income after the husband's death extend to the children. The lack of welfare provisions for the family, especially healthcare, childcare, and education, have severe impacts on the wellbeing and development of children. In extreme scenarios, disinheritance and "grabbing" can also involve the confiscation of children by the husband's family. If a widow is disinherited or homeless after the death of her husband, she faces risks of acute malnutrition, rape, prostitution, debilitating and fatal diseases, and exposure to adverse weather conditions.  These risks extend to widows' children if they remain with their mother post-disinheritance, and these hazards are compounded with loss of education and the risk of child labour.

When widows are inherited, it often has the purpose of keeping the property of the husband and the husband's male children inside the family. In many remarriages and Widow Inheritance traditions that involve the husband's brother, he will require sexual relations to produce children in the name of the dead husband, while the widow remains living with her children apart from the husband's brother, who often remains living with his own wife and children. In these scenarios, and others that involve professional widow inheritors, children grow up with the absence of a father figure, and these can be damaging to mental health and development.

The stigma that surround widows before and after "cleansing" and Widow Inheritance extend to the children as well. Children are often ostracized from their peers when their mother is a widow, as for example in the Luo community of Kenya, are not allowed to circulate within the community before "cleansing" has occurred.

See also
 Widow conservation

Notes

References

Further reading